Olivella volutella is a species of small sea snail, marine gastropod mollusk in the subfamily Olivellinae, in the family Olividae, the olives.  Species in the genus Olivella are commonly called dwarf olives.

Description
The length of the shell varies between 12 mm and 25 mm.

Distribution
This marine species occurs off Panama and off Gambier Islands (French Polynesia)

References

External links
 Lesson R. P. (1842). Mollusques recueillis dans la Mer du Sud. Genre Mitra et Pleurotoma. Revue Zoologique par la Société Cuvierienne. 5: 141-144
 Duclos, P. L. (1835-1840). Histoire naturelle générale et particulière de tous les genres de coquilles univalves marines a l'état vivant et fossile publiée par monographie. Genre Olive. Paris: Institut de France. 33 plates: pls 1-12

volutella
Gastropods described in 1811